The Bernardine church and monastery in Lviv, Ukraine, is located in the city's Old Town, south of the market square. The monastery along with the Roman Catholic church of St. Andrew, today the Greek Catholic church of St. Andrew, now belong to the Order of St. Basil the Great.

The Franciscan Observantists, known in the region as Bernardines after their monastery in Kraków in order to distinguish them from Franciscan Conventuals, were invited to Lviv by Andrzej Odrowąż in 1460. In 1509 the monastery was plundered by the Moldovan hospodar Bogdan III cel Orb. In the 17th century the present day church and monastery were constructed in the same place in the style of Italian mannerism and consecrated in 1630. As the complex was located outside Lviv's city walls it was equipped with its own fortifications from the east and south, mostly taken apart at the beginning of the 19th century. In 1733 a square belfry was added to the complex and in 1736 a monument to Saint John of Dukla, who died in the monastery in 1484, was built in front of the church. 

The interior was refurbished in the Baroque style in the years 1738–1740. The church managed to avoid being closed by the Austrian emperor Joseph II, although part of the monastery was taken over for the city archive. After the Second World War the church was closed by the Soviets and fell into disuse until the collapse of the Soviet Union when it was returned to the faithful. Since 1991 the complex is under the care of Ukrainian Greek Catholic Basilian Order and has undergone thorough renovation. Just around the corner stands the Hlyniany Gate.

External links
 

Monasteries in Lviv
Christian monasteries established in the 15th century
Ukrainian Catholic churches in Ukraine
Religious buildings and structures completed in 1630
Baroque church buildings in Ukraine
Eastern Catholic monasteries in Ukraine
1460 establishments in Europe
15th-century establishments in Ukraine